Grigori Kuzmin (8 April 1917 – 22 April 1988) was an Estonian astronomer, who worked mainly in the field of stellar dynamics.

Life and career

Grigori Kuzmin was born in 1917 in Viipuri, part of the Grand Duchy of Finland. His family was Russian. In 1924 they moved to Tallinn, Estonia, where Kuzmin  attended school. Although his mother tongue was Russian, and he had learned to speak Finnish during childhood, after moving to Estonia, Estonian became his primary language. Kuzmin graduated cum laude from the University of Tartu in 1940.

See also
Tartu Observatory

References

External links
NASA ADS search for G. Kuzmin works

1917 births
1988 deaths
Estonian astronomers
University of Tartu alumni
Academic staff of the University of Tartu
Scientists from Vyborg
Soviet astronomers
Estonian people of Russian descent
Russian emigrants to Estonia